Holt County may refer to:

 Holt County, Missouri 
 Holt County, Nebraska